Thomas "Tom" Ripton ( – 23 March 1946) was an English rugby union footballer who played in the 1890s. He played at representative level for Hull & Ouse XV, and at club level for Hull Kingston Rovers (Heritage №) (captain), and Hull FC, as a goal-kicking full-back, or centre, i.e. number 12 or 13.

Background
Thomas Ripton's birth was registered in Hull district, East Riding of Yorkshire, his death was registered in Hull district, East Riding of Yorkshire, and his funeral took place at Hull General Cemetery on  Wednesday 27 March 1946.

Playing career

County trial appearances
Thomas Ripton played, and scored 1-goal in Hull & Ouse XV's 12-9 victory over Northern (featuring footballers from Yorkshire clubs; Harrogate RUFC, Leeman Wanderers RFC (on Leeman Road, York, defunct), Otley R.U.F.C., Ripon RUFC, and Tadcaster RFC (defunct since the mid/late 1960s).

Club career
Thomas Ripton once played for Hull Kingston Rovers against Wakefield Trinity at "the present Hull ground" in the morning, and played as a full-back for Hull F.C. against Rawcliffe RFC at the Athletic ground (on Holderness Road), Hull in the afternoon.

Genealogical information
Thomas Ripton's marriage to Eliza (née Sykes, birth registered first ¼ 1876 in Hull district – death registered aged 60 first ¼ 1940 in Hull district) was registered fourth ¼ 1897 in Hull district, East Riding of Yorkshire. They had children; Ivy Ripton, Tom Ripton (born ), Muriel Ripton, Bill Ripton, Royal B. "Roy" Ripton (birth registered third ¼ 1913 in Hull district), and Dorothy "Dolly" Ripton (birth registered second ¼ 1916 in Hull district). He is related to the rugby league footballer who played in the 1960s and 1970s for Hull Kingston Rovers, and the physiotherapist of the 1970s and 1980s for Hull F.C.; Ray Norrie (birth registered fourth ¼  in Hull district).

References

External links
Search for "Ripton" at espn.co.uk
Search for "Ripton" at rugbyleagueproject.org
 (archived by web.archive.org) Stats → PastPlayers → R at hullfc.com
(archived by web.archive.org) Stats → PastPlayers → R at hullfc.com
Search for "Thomas Ripton" at britishnewspaperarchive.co.uk
Humberside Echoes

1872 births
1946 deaths
English rugby league players
English rugby union players
Hull F.C. players
Hull Kingston Rovers captains
Hull Kingston Rovers players
Rugby league players from Kingston upon Hull
Rugby union centres
Rugby union fullbacks
Rugby union players from Kingston upon Hull